Paraliancalus is a genus of flies in the family Dolichopodidae. It is found in Hawaii.

Species
Paraliancalus laciniafemur Evenhuis & Bickel, 2011
Paraliancalus metallicus (Grimshaw, 1901)

References

Hydrophorinae
Dolichopodidae genera
Insects of Hawaii
Taxa named by Octave Parent